Mai Kadra (also spelled May Cadera) is a town in Tigray Region, Ethiopia near the Sudanese border. Mai Kadra' suffered from Mass extrajudicial killings Mai Kadra massacre during Tigray War

Overview
Mai Kadra is a market town on the Gonder–Humera road, in the Kafta Humera district of the Mi'irabawi (Western) Zone of the Tigray Region. Approximately 30 kilometers south of Humera, its population was estimated as 4,000 to 4,500. Prior to the Tigray War, migrant workers, mainly from the Amhara Region but also from a few other areas, would travel to Mai Kadra for seasonal work on large sesame and millet farms. These migrant laborers would arrive every September to help with the harvest.

Mai Kadra massacre 

On 9-10 November 2020, an ethnic massacre occurred in Mai Kadra in which hundreds of ethnic Amhara civilians were killed.

References

Populated places in the Tigray Region